Siegfried Schenke (born 6 May 1943, in Sitzendorf) is a former sprinter who specialized in the 200 metres event. He represented East Germany and competed for the club SC Motor Jena.

Achievements

References

1943 births
Living people
East German male sprinters
Athletes (track and field) at the 1972 Summer Olympics
Olympic athletes of East Germany
European Athletics Championships medalists
Universiade medalists in athletics (track and field)
Universiade gold medalists for East Germany
Universiade silver medalists for East Germany
Medalists at the 1970 Summer Universiade